Laurie Hope Beechman (April 4, 1953 – March 8, 1998) was an American actress and singer, known for her work in Broadway musicals. She also had a career as a cabaret performer and recording artist. After her death, the West Bank Cafe Downstairs Theater Bar in New York was renamed the Laurie Beechman Theatre.

Beechman made her Broadway debut in the 1977 original production of Annie. For her role as the narrator in the 1982 original Broadway production of Joseph and the Amazing Technicolor Dreamcoat, she was nominated for the Tony Award for Best Featured Actress in a Musical. She then went on to be the first actress to play the role of Grizabella in the US national touring production of Cats in 1983, before replacing Betty Buckley in the Broadway production in 1984. She would play the role on Broadway for over four years. She also starred in the Broadway productions of The Pirates of Penzance (1981) and Les Misérables (1990) and returned to the role of Grizabella for four months in 1997, when Cats became the longest running musical in Broadway history.

Early life
Born in Philadelphia, Pennsylvania, Beechman possessed an incredible singing voice, powerful, yet subtle and nuanced. After moving to Haddon Township, New Jersey, she graduated in 1971 from Haddon Township High School, where her talents were instantly recognized, winning her lead roles in numerous school musicals.

Laurie performed in an acoustic folk-rock group with Rick Ferrante and Roy Baker called The Destiny Trio during the summers of 1971 and 1972 in North Wildwood, NJ, at a small club called the Manor Lounge. She subsequently enrolled at New York University. Dropping out of NYU after a few years, Beechman made her Broadway debut in 1977 as part of the original cast of Annie, playing five different roles. This led to small roles in the Public Theater's production of The Pirates of Penzance and the 1979 film version of Hair.

A detour into rock and roll resulted in the 1980 Atlantic Records release Laurie and the Sighs. With little support from a new management team at the label, the album failed badly and Beechman was looking for stage work.

Broadway
Beechman made her Broadway debut in the original Broadway cast of Annie. She played various roles, most notably "Star to Be", a role which was written for her after the creative team heard her powerful voice, and she is credited in the original Broadway cast recording.

She played the lead role of the Narrator in the original Broadway cast of Joseph and the Amazing Technicolor Dreamcoat during its first Broadway production in 1982, earning a Tony Award nomination for Best Actress (Featured Role - Musical) and a Theatre World Award.

In December 1983, Beechman headed the First National Company of Cats as "Grizabella, The Glamour Cat" when the tour opened in Boston. Within four months, she assumed the role on Broadway, replacing Tony winner Betty Buckley. Belting out the show's hit song "Memory", Beechman stayed with the show for more than four years and made occasional return engagements over the next decade.

Set to take over the role of Fantine in the touring production of Les Misérables in late 1988, Beechman was diagnosed with ovarian cancer. After months of treatment, with her longtime friend Ken Gilmurray by her side, Laurie bounced back with a celebrated cabaret act at New York's legendary Ballroom. This was quickly followed by a new production of Joseph and the Amazing Technicolor Dreamcoat at the Walnut Street Theatre in Philadelphia.

In early 1990, Beechman made her long-awaited debut as Fantine in the Broadway production of Les Misérables. She stayed for several months, eventually heading out on tour where she finally played the role in Philadelphia during the Christmas season of 1990. During this time, her self-produced solo recording, Listen To My Heart, was released to great acclaim. The following fall she celebrated regaining her health after fighting off a recurrence of her cancer by, as she put it, "throwing myself a nightclub act," returning once again to the Ballroom.

Discography

Later life and death
During the later years of her life, Beechman married Neil Mazzella in 1992, recorded three more solo albums, performed numerous concerts and club dates, sang at President Bill Clinton's second inaugural gala, was awarded the Gilda's Club's "It's Always Something" Award, and returned to singing and acting. In early 1995, Beechman's cancer returned. She spent an hour on The Phil Donahue Show singing and discussing her condition and her will to keep going.

Having returned to play Grizabella on Broadway for the ninth (1991) and tenth (1992) anniversary performances of Cats, she again reprised the role from May to September 1997, so was in the cast on June 19 of that year, when Cats surpassed A Chorus Line to become the longest-running musical in Broadway history at that time.

Although her treatments were ongoing, Beechman continued performing until just a few months before her death on March 8, 1998, at age 44. One month later, a memorial service was held for her at the Winter Garden Theatre, the theatre where Cats played for many years. She was survived by her mother, Dolly Beechman Schnall, stepfather, Dr. Nate Schnall, two sisters, Claudia Beechman Cohen and Jane Beechman Segal, and husband, Neil Mazzella. She was buried at Montefiore Cemetery in Rockledge, Pennsylvania.

Legacy
The Laurie Beechman Theatre on 42nd Street in New York City is named for her.
The Laurie Beechman Cabaret at University of the Arts in Philadelphia is also named for her.
In 1999, a year after her death, a scholarship was established in her name at the University of the Arts Musical Theatre Department.
Laurie recorded three albums after "Listen to My Heart":  "The Time Between the Time", "The Andrew Lloyd Webber Album" and "No One is Alone: Songs of Hope and Inspiration From Broadway".  She recorded a track, Jacques Brel's "If We Only Have Love", with her sister, Claudia Beechman, and another, a medley from Leonard Bernstein's "Candide" and "West Side Story", with Sam Harris.

References

External links
 
 
 
 
 Laurie Beechman - Celebration of a Life
 Laurie Beechman.com - Launched October 13, 2008
 Laurie Beechman Discography

1953 births
1998 deaths
American musical theatre actresses
Jewish American musicians
Deaths from ovarian cancer
Tisch School of the Arts alumni
People from Haddon Township, New Jersey
Actresses from Philadelphia
20th-century American actresses
Burials in Pennsylvania
Deaths from cancer in New York (state)
20th-century American singers
20th-century American women singers